"We Have All the Time in the World" is a James Bond theme song sung by Louis Armstrong. Its music was composed by John Barry and the lyrics by Hal David. It is a secondary musical theme in the 1969 Bond film On Her Majesty's Secret Service, the title theme being the instrumental "On Her Majesty's Secret Service", also composed by Barry. The song title is taken from Bond's final words in both the novel and the film, spoken after the death of Tracy Bond, his wife. As Armstrong was too ill to play his trumpet, it was therefore played by another musician. Barry chose Armstrong because he felt he could "deliver the title line with irony".

The song was released as a single in both the US and the UK (under the abridged title "All The Time in the World" in the UK) to coincide with the release of the film in December 1969, but did not chart in either market. The recording became a hit in the UK twenty-five years later, in 1994, as a result of a Guinness beer commercial, after My Bloody Valentine chose to cover it for charity. Armstrong's version was then re-released on vinyl and CD and reached #3 in the UK Singles Chart and #4 in Ireland. In 2005, a BBC survey found that it was the third most popular love song played at weddings.

In addition to My Bloody Valentine, "We Have All the Time in the World" has been covered by The Specials, Iggy Pop (whose version plays during the end credits of the film The Jacket), Fun Lovin' Criminals, Vic Damone, Michael Ball, Giorgia Todrani, The Puppini Sisters, Tindersticks, The Pale Fountains, Propellerheads, The Wedding Present, Shirley Bassey (for a later withdrawn album of Bond themes), Thomas White and Alfie Boe.

John Barry cited "We Have All the Time in the World" as one of his favourite Bond compositions, saying it was one of the finest pieces of music he had written for a Bond movie and also because of the pleasure of working with Louis Armstrong.

The instrumental version of the theme reappears twice in the 2021 James Bond film No Time to Die, in addition to the lyrical variation being played at the beginning of the closing credits.

See also 
 Outline of James Bond

References 

1969 songs
1994 singles
Songs from James Bond films
Louis Armstrong songs
On Her Majesty's Secret Service
Songs with lyrics by Hal David
Songs with music by John Barry (composer)
Warner Records singles
Song recordings produced by Phil Ramone
The Specials songs